Jamestown Armory is a historic National Guard armory building located at Jamestown in Chautauqua County, New York.  It was built in 1932 for Company E, 174th Infantry Brigade.  It consists of a Tudor Revival-style administration building with an attached drill shed. It is one of 12 extant armory buildings designed by State architect William Haugaard.

It was listed on the National Register of Historic Places in 1995.

References

External links
Jamestown Armory - Jamestown, New York - Military Installations on Waymarking.com

Jamestown, New York
Armories on the National Register of Historic Places in New York (state)
Infrastructure completed in 1932
Buildings and structures in Chautauqua County, New York
National Register of Historic Places in Chautauqua County, New York